Early memories may refer to:
In humans
 Childhood amnesia
 Memory#Memory in infancy

In computing
 Computer memory#History